Meppadi is a village in the Indian state of Kerala.  It is an extremely scenic hill station on the State Highway between Kozhikode and Ooty.  The nearest city is Kalpetta, which is the headquarters of the Wayanad revenue district.

Economy
Tea cultivation is the main economic activity of Meppadi village.  There are also some vegetable cultivation on small scale.  Most of the people living in Meppadi are workers in various tea estates where they cultivate cardamom too.  There is a small town catering to locals and the tourists. The tourists come to enjoy the salubrious climate of the place.

Distance
Meppadi is 12 km from Kalpetta town in the Wayanad District. It is 78 km from Kozhikode (Calicut), 106 km from Ooty, and 281 km from Bangalore.

Tourist attractions
Kanthanpara Water falls
900 Kandi
Soochipara Falls
Meenmutty Falls, Wayanad
Edakkal Caves
Pookot Lake
Chembra Peak
Karapuzha Dam
Vellarimala
Sunrise valley
Karapuzha Dam
Thanhilode

Image gallery

See also

 Chundale town
 Kalpetta town
 Mango Orange village
 Vaduvanchal town

References

Villages in Wayanad district
Hill stations in Kerala
Populated places in the Western Ghats
Geography of Wayanad district